Senator Shafer may refer to:

David Shafer (politician) (born 1965), Georgia State Senate
Ira Shafer (1831–1896), New York State Senate
Raymond P. Shafer (1917–2006), Pennsylvania State Senate

See also
Senator Schaefer (disambiguation)
Senator Schaffer (disambiguation)
Senator Shaffer (disambiguation)